Senator Nolan may refer to:

Dennis Nolan (politician) (born 1961), Nevada State Senate
Howard C. Nolan Jr. (born 1932), New York State Senate
Thomas M. Nolan (1916–1989), Pennsylvania State Senate

See also
Frank W. Nolen (born 1939), Virginia State Senate
Senator Noland (disambiguation)